The 2009 Wagner Seahawks football team represented Wagner College in the 2009 NCAA Division I FCS football season as a member of the Northeast Conference (NEC). The Seahawks were led by 29th-year head coach Walt Hameline and played their home games at Wagner College Stadium. They finished the season 6–5 overall and 5–3 in NEC play to tie for third place.

Schedule

References

Wagner
Wagner Seahawks football seasons
Wagner Seahawks football